Joel Joan i Juvé (born 2 November 1970) is a Spanish actor, screenwriter and director.

Biography
Joan studied dramatic arts at Institut del Teatre in Barcelona. He began his acting career on the stage, appearing in productions directed by Calixto Bieito, Sergi Belbel and Rosa Maria Sardà.

His first major television role came in 1994 on the TV3 show  Poblenou. That same year he helped found the Kràmpack theater company. The company's success gave them the opportunity to create a television show. The sitcom Plats bruts (“Dirty Dishes”), co-starring Joan, made its debut on TV3 in 1999. Joan went on to direct, write and co-star in Porca misèria, which aired on TV3 from 2004 to 2007.

Joan has also appeared in films, including roles in Manuel Huerga's Salvador (Puig Antich) (2006) and Woody Allen's Vicky Cristina Barcelona (2008).

He is an administrator of Arriska Films, the production company he founded in 2000. Arriska Films has produced the television show Porca misèries and the film Excuses!

Joan is one of the instigators of the Sobirania i Progrés ("Sovereignty and Progress") platform in support of Catalan independence. He has been the president of the Catalan Academy of Cinema since its foundation in 2008 to 2013.

Outstanding works

Theatre 
Fum, fum, fum
Kràmpack
L'avar de Molière
Sóc lletja
Excuses!
Glengarry Glen Ross
Ets aquí?
Peer Gynt
Secrets compartits
El nom

Television 
Poblenou
Rosa
Periodistas
Plats Bruts
Porca Misèria
El Crac (The Crackpot)

Cinema
Salvador (Puig Antich) by Manuel Huerga (2006), actor.
Excuses! (2003), actor and director.
Friends Have Reasons by Gerardo Herrero (2000), actor.
Heart of the Warrior by Daniel Monzón (1999), actor.
The Good Life by David Trueba (1996), actor.
Rosita, please! by Ventura Pons (1993), actor.
Monturiol, el senyor del mar by Francesc Bellmunt (1993), actor.
Fènix 11*23 (2012), director.

Radio 
El món a RAC1 on RAC1.

Books 
Despullats (2003), with Víctor Alexandre.

References

External links

Joel Joan plays

1970 births
Living people
Male film actors from Catalonia
Film directors from Catalonia
Male stage actors from Catalonia
Male television actors from Catalonia
Theatre directors from Catalonia
Spanish male film actors
21st-century Spanish male actors
20th-century Spanish male actors